Mathias Guillemette (born 14 January 2002) is a Canadian professional racing cyclist, who specializes in track cycling.

Major results
2021
 UCI Nations Cup
2nd Team pursuit, Cali
2022
 UCI Champions League
1st Elimination, Palma
2nd Elimination, Paris
2nd Elimination, London I
3rd Elimination, Berlin
 National Track Championships
1st  Madison (with Dylan Bibic)
2nd Omnium
2nd Team pursuit
3rd Individual pursuit
2023
 National Track Championships
1st  Madison (with Dylan Bibic)
2nd Scratch

References

External links
 
 

2002 births
Living people
Canadian male cyclists
Canadian track cyclists
Cyclists from Quebec
Cyclists at the 2022 Commonwealth Games
21st-century Canadian people